Casper Oimoen (May 8, 1906 – July 28, 1995) was an American ski jumping champion.

Biography
Casper Oimoen was born at Etnedal in Oppland, Norway. He immigrated to the United States in 1923 and settled near Minot, North Dakota. Unable to compete in the 1928 Olympics because he was not an American citizen, he entered the Olympics in 1932 and again as captain of the U.S. team in 1936, placing 5th and 13th respectively.
Casper Oimoen won over 400 medals and trophies during his skiing career. He won the Northwestern Ski Jumping Championship nine times in nine entries, the Montana State Jumping Championship six times in six entries, the Central United States Championship ten times, six of them in consecutive years (1925-1931), and the United States National Ski Jumping Championship three times. In 1930, he won the Eastern, Central and National Championships, plus eight other firsts, a feat which has never been equaled.

Oimoen was inducted into the U.S. Skiing Hall of Fame in 1963. Casper Oimoen was granted the Theodore Roosevelt Rough Rider Award by the Governor of the State of North Dakota in  1973. Today his portrait, by North Dakota artist Vern Skaug, is on display in the Hall of Fame at the North Dakota State Capital Building in Bismarck. He was inducted into the Scandinavian-American Hall of Fame in 1984. A bronze statue of Casper Oimoen stands in the Scandinavian Heritage Park in Minot, North Dakota.

References

Further reading
Stalions, Sonja Oimoen  A Rough Way to Ride Between Earth and Sky: Memoir of Ski Jumper Casper Oimoen (North American Heritage Press. 2003) 
Engen, Alan K.  For the Love of Skiing: A Visual History of Skiing (Gibbs Smith Publishers. 1998)

External links

 “Theodore Roosevelt Rough Rider Awards”
 “American Ski Jumping Hall of Fame”
 “Norwegian American Hall of Fame”
 “U. S. National Ski and Snowboard Hall of Fame”

1906 births
1995 deaths
People from Oppland
American male ski jumpers
Ski jumpers at the 1932 Winter Olympics
Ski jumpers at the 1936 Winter Olympics
Olympic ski jumpers of the United States
Sportspeople from Minot, North Dakota
Norwegian emigrants to the United States